The South African Railways Class  of 1981 is a mainline diesel-electric locomotive.

Between May 1981 and 1982, the South African Railways placed one hundred Class  General Motors Electro-Motive Division type GT26M2C diesel-electric locomotives in service. After these locomotives were commissioned, the national carrier was not to invest in new diesel-electric locomotives again until 2009, nearly three decades later.

Manufacturer
The Class  type GT26M2C diesel-electric locomotive was designed for the South African Railways (SAR) by General Motors Electro-Motive Division (GM-EMD) and built by General Motors South Africa (GMSA) in Port Elizabeth. Equipped with later model GM-EMD D31 traction motors instead of the earlier GM-EMD D29B, it is a more powerful version of the GM-EMD type GT26MC Classes 34-200, 34-600 and 34-800.

Service
The Class  locomotives work on mainlines in the northern and northeastern parts of the country. Most of them are shedded at Ermelo and Lydenburg in Mpumalanga and at Empangeni in KwaZulu-Natal. They work on the Belfast-Steelpoort line and on the manganese route between the Mpumalanga Lowveld and KwaZulu-Natal from Komatipoort through Swaziland to Empangeni and Richards Bay.

On the Natal South Coast line, Classes 34-200 and 37-000 worked the Simuma-Mount Vernon clinker trains as long ago as 2002 while the line was still electrified, although the Class 34-200 were more common when the train ran behind diesel-electrics. Since diesel officially took over the workings at the end of October 2011 and electrics were rarely seen until disappearing from the South Coast completely in March 2012, only the Class 37-000 have been used, normally in sets of three.

Sun City Express
On Saturday 4 March 1989 Sol Kerzner’s Sun City Express began running. It consisted of a dedicated rake of thirteen coaches hauled by a Class 37-000 locomotive that ran between Johannesburg, Pretoria and a rural halt that was specially created near Sun City where the railway line crossed the Sun City-Thabazimbi road near Heystekrand. Passengers transferred to buses for the  trip between Sun City Halt and the Sun City Casino and Hotel near Rustenburg.

Locomotive no. 37-044 was re-geared for higher speed and painted in a maroon livery with gray sills and understructure, yellow buffer beams and golden yellow bands all around the body, interrupted on the sides by the inscription The Sun City EXPRESS in white.

Although initially well received, the train began to suffer from declining patronage and was eventually cancelled from Monday 30 March 1992, three years after its launch.

Rebuilding to Class 39-000
In 2005, a project commenced to rebuild new Class  type GM-EMD GT26CU-3 diesel-electric locomotives for Spoornet from Classes ,  and  locomotives, using suitable frames from wrecked locomotives. Two companies were invited to produce prototypes for the project.

Number 39-251
One of these companies was Electro-Motive Sibanye, a joint venture between the newly established Electro-Motive Diesel (EMD) and Sibanye Trade and Services, a South African Black Economic Empowerment (BEE) company dealing with locomotives and spare parts. The Sibanye venture produced only one locomotive, rebuilt from Class  no.  in 2008 and numbered . However, the locomotive was tested and rejected by Transnet, reportedly due to poor quality. Furthermore, when serious tender irregularities came to light, the locomotive rebuilding deal between Transnet and Electro-Motive Sibanye was cancelled.

Although it was initially painted in the red Transnet Freight Rail livery, no.  never worked for Transnet and was later reported as sold to RRL, a company which came about out of the abortive joint venture between EMD and Sibanye. RRL is based at a workshop in the old Pretoria Steel Works complex and several of its locomotives are active in the gold fields around Welkom in the Free State. No.  remained in the possession of Sibanye Trade and Services and was renumbered . It was later hired or leased to the Khumani iron ore mine in the Northern Cape and renumbered again to LC9-1.

Numbers 39-001 to 39-005
The other company was Transwerk (later Transnet Rail Engineering and then Transnet Engineering), who produced five locomotives in its shops in Bloemfontein between 2006 and 2008, rebuilt from three Class  and two Class .

End of project
It was intended to produce one hundred Class , but in spite of the technical success of the Transnet Rail Engineering part of the project, rebuilding was halted after completing the first five units due to higher than anticipated cost. It was decided, instead of rebuilding old locomotives, to rather continue the program by building fifty new Class  locomotives from imported and locally produced components. Only one Class  locomotive was therefore rebuilt.

Works numbers
The Class  builder’s works numbers and the one rebuilding are listed in the table.

Liveries
The Class 37-000 were all delivered in the SAR Gulf Red livery with signal red buffer beams, yellow side stripes on the long hood sides and a yellow V on each end. In the 1990s many of them began to be repainted in the Spoornet orange livery with a yellow and blue chevron pattern on the buffer beams. At least two, numbers 37-050 and 37-059, later received the Spoornet maroon livery. In the late 1990s a few were repainted in the Spoornet blue livery with outline numbers on the long hood sides. After 2008 in the Transnet Freight Rail (TFR) era, some were repainted in the TFR red, green and yellow livery.

Illustration

References

3490
C-C locomotives
Co′Co′ locomotives
Co+Co locomotives
Electro-Motive Division locomotives
GMSA locomotives
Cape gauge railway locomotives
Railway locomotives introduced in 1981
1981 in South Africa